Dhanak is a 2015 Indian Hindi-language children's road film written and directed by Nagesh Kukunoor. Produced by Manish Mundra, Nagesh Kukunoor, and Elahe Hiptoola, the film features Hetal Gada and Krrish Chhabria as the two children, playing brother and sister, in the leading roles, with supporting performances from Chet Dixon, Vipin Sharma, Gulfam Khan, Vibha Chibber, Flora Saini, and Vijay Maurya. The film was released India wide to widely positive reviews on 17 June 2016. Dhanak received the Best Children's Film trophy at the 64th National Film Awards. Dhanak won the Special Mention Crystal Bear for the Best Feature Film by The Children's Jury for Generation Kplus at the 65th Berlinale.

Plot
Every morning Pari (Hetal Gada) and Chotu's (Krrish Chhabria) long walk to school begins with the toss of a coin outside their hut. The winner will decide if the story that will be told on the way to school that day will be one about a Shah Rukh Khan film or a Salman Khan film. The siblings are rivals in their love for the two stars. Pari is devoted to Shah Rukh and Chotu worships Salman Khan (down to wearing a replica of the star's trademark silver bracelet with a blue stone).

Ten-year-old Pari holds her precocious eight-year-old brother's hand throughout the journey to school and back. She's not just his friend and sister but, since Chotu is visually impaired, also his guide. With just months to go before Chotu turns nine, Pari feels the pressure to fulfill her promise to her brother - that he will have his eyesight back before his ninth birthday.

Hope floats when she spots a poster of Shah Rukh Khan (SRK) encouraging eye donations. She begins to write him letters addressed at Mannat in Mumbai, which go unanswered. Eventually, they realize that he is not in Mumbai, but in a village in Rajasthan for a film shoot portraying a Rajput Prince. Convinced that a meeting with SRK is all it would take to get Chotu his eyes back, the children set off alone on a 300 km journey traversing testing terrain.

Cast

 Krrish Chhabria as Chotu
 Hetal Gada as Pari
 Vipin Sharma as Dungaram
 Gulfam Khan as Gowri
 Idhant Singh as Madan Mohan
 Swastik Chavan as Bully
 Narendra Singh Rajpurohit as Bathposh
 Harmeet Arora as Aashajii
 Rajiv Laxman as Gardu
 Pratyaksh Kalra as Shamsher Singh
 Rahul Lohani as Saffron Robed man
 Ramakant Dayma as Prataap Sharma (Kidnapper)
 Vibha Chibber as Sheera Mata/Vibha
 Ramakant Dayama as Old Man (Kidnapper)
 Chet Dixon as Douglas Adams (special appearance in Damadam)
 Flora Saini as Gypsy Woman
 Bharati Achrekar as Dadisa
 Suresh Menon as Badrinath
 Ninad Kamat as Aatmaram Khandelwal
 Vinny Arora as Asha
 Priyank Sharma

Production
Dhanak was entirely shot in Jodhpur, and Jaisalmer, Rajasthan, India.

Release
The film was premiered at the 65th Berlin International Film Festival (Berlinale). Dhanak was also screened at the Indian Film Festival of Los Angeles, and the Toronto International Film Festival. It was released nationwide in India on 17 June 2016.

Accolades
The film won the Crystal Bear for Best Children's Film, and Special Mention for the Best Feature Film by the Children's Jury for Generation Kplus at 65th Berlin International Film Festival. 
The film has garnered the Best Film Award in the main category-Children's Feature Film Competition, Cinema in Sneakers, and the Best Film Award at the Montreal International Children's Film Festival (FIFEM). The film won Best Children's Film at the 64th National Film Awards.

Soundtrack 
All songs were composed and produced by Tapas Relia. The lyrics were by Manoj Yadav, Mir Ali Husain and Tapas Relia.

References

External links
 

Indian road movies
Films about actors
Films set in Rajasthan
Films shot in Rajasthan
Indian children's films
2010s Hindi-language films
Films about blind people in India
Films scored by Tapas Relia
Best Children's Film National Film Award winners
Films directed by Nagesh Kukunoor
Indian drama road movies